Ferris Girls' Junior & Senior High School (フェリス女学院中学校・高等学校 Ferisu Jogakuin Chūgakkō Kōtōgakkō) is a junior and senior high school for girls in Yokohama. It is a part of Ferris Jogakuin (学校法人フェリス女学院).

History
The institution began in 1870, when the first unmarried female missionary of the Dutch Reformed Church in Japan, Mary Eddy Kidder began teaching at a facility established by Clara Hepburn, wife of James Curtis Hepburn. The Hepburns had established their girls' school in 1862. Kidder established her "Miss Kidder's School for Girls" after the Hepburns left Japan. This was Japan's first mission-sponsored school, and the country's first higher learning institution for women. Initially Kidder's classes had boys, but in September 1871 she restricted her classes to girls only.

The school was named "Isaac Ferris Seminary" (フェリス･セミナリー Ferisu Seminarī), after the head of the Reformed Church Board of Foreign Missions Isaac Ferris, in 1875. That year, its school and residence facilities were built at 178 Yamate. It was renamed to Ferris Waei Jogakkō (フェリス和英女学校 Ferisu Waei Jogakkō; "Ferris Japanese-English Girls' School") in 1889. Mary Deyo of New York was a teacher at Ferris Seminary from 1888 to 1894.

During the Great Kantō earthquake of 1923 the headmistress, Mrs. Kuyper, died, and school buildings were destroyed. A building in the Yamate Campus named after Kuyper, Kuyper Memorial Hall, opened in 1929.

In 1941 the school was renamed Yokohama Yamate Girls' School (横浜山手女学院 Yokohama Yamate Jogakuin); this temporary name change occurred during an anti-English language sentiment during World War II era Japan. It was renamed Ferris Girls' School in 1951.

Notable alumnae
Kashiko Kawakita
Toshiko Matsuo
Chiyo Sakakibara
Masako Ōkawara
Anna Ogino
Izumi Nakamitsu
Yuko Hara
Shiho Fujimura
Sayumi Horie
Yurie Miura
Mayumi Miyata
Wakamatsu Shizuko

See also
 Ferris University

References

External links
  Ferris Girls' School
 "Middle Level Education for Girls" (Archive). Japan's Modern Educational System. Ministry of Education, Culture, Sports, Science and Technology.

Schools in Yokohama
High schools in Yokohama
Girls' schools in Japan